Dion-Olympos (Díon-Ólympos) is a municipality in the Pieria regional unit, Central Macedonia, Greece. The seat of the municipality is the town Litochoro. The municipality has an area of 495.314 km2.

Municipality
The municipality Dion-Olympos was formed as part of the 2011 local government reform by the merger of the following 3 former municipalities, that became municipal units:
Dion
East Olympos
Litochoro

References

Municipalities of Central Macedonia
Populated places in Pieria (regional unit)
Mount Olympus